Richard Hornung (February 16, 1950 – December 30, 1995) was an American costume designer best known for his work with the Coen brothers on films such as The Hudsucker Proxy, Raising Arizona, and Barton Fink for which he was nominated for an Oscar.

His other credits include Broadway shows Sunday in the Park With George, Brighton Beach Memoirs, The News (musical), and Candida (play).

Life and career 
He was born in Bethlehem, Pennsylvania on February 16, 1950. He was an Allentown, Pennsylvania native.

Hornung graduated from Kutztown University of Pennsylvania. He later received a master's degree in costume design from the University of Illinois at Urbana–Champaign.

Prior to becoming a costume designer, he was a substitute English teacher. When he moved to New York City, he worked for various theaters, including regional, Off-Broadway, On-Broadway, and the Juilliard Drama School.

He has mentored costume designers such as Mark Bridges and Mary Zophres. Zophres has since taken over as the Coen Brother's main costume designer.

He died of AIDS on December 30, 1995.

Selected filmography

References

1950 births
1995 deaths
American costume designers
People from Bethlehem, Pennsylvania
AIDS-related deaths in California